Çalkışla is a village in the Tercan District, Erzincan Province, Turkey. The village is populated by Kurds of the Maskan tribe and had a population of 22 in 2021.

The hamlets of Aşağıçalkışla, Bahçecik, Bıyıkören, Düztaş and Yoluca are attached to the village.

References 

Villages in Tercan District
Kurdish settlements in Erzincan Province